Terminalia littoralis is a large tropical tree in the leadwood tree family, Combretaceae. It grows on exposed coastal headlands and along beaches, in Samoa and Fiji islands  where it can withstand drought, strong winds, and salt spray.
It is related to Terminalia catappa.

References

External links

Trees of Australia
Flora of Samoa
Flora of Christmas Island
littoralis